Zoran Petrović may refer to:

 Zoran Petrović (referee) (born 1952), Serbian football referee
 Zoran Petrović (writer) (1954–2018), Serbian poet, novelist, and screenwriter
 Zoran Petrović (water polo) (born 1960), Serbian Olympic water polo player